Narmin Knyaz — Azerbaijani radio and television presenter; business woman, voice actor and influencer.

She is the founder of the program format named “1 şəhər və 24 saat” which was accepted by Ictimai (Public) Television and Radio Broadcasting Company (ITV) and currently taking care of shooting schedules and hosting the very show. Furthermore, starting from new season Narmin is the host of “61!” television show airing on the aforementioned TV channel which is the licensed version of the popular game “Jeopardy!”. Being her second program format, Narmin’s new show “Tarzi Makan” was also accepted and broadcast by İTV.

She has received Grand-Prix award for the short film "Məhkum" she had directed for "No Smoking" Film Festival which was held in Azerbaijan for the first time in 2013.

Prior to that, she worked as a project manager and presenter at Mediapost Information Agency where she managed shows for online TV and presented news and podcasts. She also worked as a radio presenter at Araz 103.3 FM for the period of 2014-2016 where she provided her ideas for several radio shows.

She is also known as a voice actor and influencer.

Biography 

Narmin Knyaz was born and raised in Barda, Azerbaijan. She has 7 years of piano education at Khan Shushinski Music School No. 3 in Barda city. She graduated from Nariman Narimanov secondary school in Barda. She obtained her bachelor’s degree from Azerbaijan State Pedagogical University in 2010–2014.

She participated in the “No Smoking Film Festival” dedicated to "May 31 - World No Tobacco Day" held in Azerbaijan for the first time in 2013. State, international and non-governmental organizations, members of the National Coalition against Tobacco, the Public Health and Reforms Center (PHRC) of the Ministry of Healthcare of Azerbaijan Republic, the representatives of “Addım” Creative Youth Association, as well as prominent figures of the country attended the opening night ceremony held at the Lake Palace Hotel in Baku on May 27, 2013. N.Knyaz won the Grand Prix award at the festival for her short film "Prisoner", directed by her. Narmin Knyazli presented the main prize of the festival at the final night of the 2nd “No Smoking” Film Festival, which was held with the support of “Addım” GT, the Youth Foundation under the President of the Republic of Azerbaijan, the Ministry of Youth and Sports of the Republic of Azerbaijan, PHRC in 2014, at the Park Cinema on June 17, 2014.

In 2014-2016, she worked as a radio host on Araz 103.3 FM and was the project manager for several radio programs.

Since 2019, the program project called "1 şəhər və 24 saat" (1 City and 24 Hours), authored and hosted by her, has been broadcast in İctimai Television (İTV).

From 2020 to 2021, she worked as a project manager and presenter at Mediapost News Agency, where she hosted shows and presented news and podcasts for online TV.

In 2020, she was one of the founders of the "Davam" All-Republican Youth Movement at a briefing organized at the Holiday Inn Hotel in Baku. Each member of the Initiative Group represents the youth of Azerbaijan in this movement in a specific direction. Thus, Narmin Knyaz acts as a representative of Azerbaijani youth active in social networks. She is also a member of the Board of Directors of the movement.

On September 25, 2021, Narmin's second program format, "Tarzi Makan", was also accepted and broadcast by İTV.

From September 29, 2021, she is the host of the licensed version of the popular game “Jeopardy!”, the program “61!”, broadcast on İctimai Television.

In 2021, she founded “Filmabe Entertainment”, a company that produces TV projects and a number of commercials.

References

External links 

 
 Азербайджанский блогер попробовала себя в роли маршала Гран-при «Формулы-1» - ФОТО

1992 births
Living people
Azerbaijani television presenters
Azerbaijani women television presenters
Azerbaijani businesspeople
Azerbaijani television people